The 1993 World Mountain Running Championships was the 9th edition of the global mountain running competition, World Mountain Running Championships, organised by the World Mountain Running Association and was held in Gap, Hautes-Alpes, France on 5 September 1993.

Results

Men
Distance 10.9 km, difference in height 790 m (climb).

Men team

Men junior

Men junior team

Women

Women team

References

External links
 World Mountain Running Association official web site

World Mountain Running Championships
World Long Distance Mountain Running
World Long Distance Mountain Running